This is a list of tennis players who have represented the Ecuador Davis Cup team in an official Davis Cup match. Ecuador have taken part in the competition since 1961.

Players

References

Lists of Davis Cup tennis players
 Davis Cup